Ganaveh County (Luri and ) is in Bushehr province, Iran. The capital of the county is the city of Bandar Ganaveh. At the 2006 census, the county's population was 82,937 in 17,701 households. The following census in 2011 counted 90,493 people in 22,355 households. At the 2016 census, the county's population was 102,484 in 28,181 households. Abū-Saʿīd Jannābī, the founder of the Qarmatian state, was from Ganaveh. The people of Ganaveh speak the Luri language.

Administrative divisions

The population history of Ganaveh County's administrative divisions over three consecutive censuses is shown in the following table. The latest census shows two districts, two rural districts, and two cities.

References

 

Counties of Bushehr Province